Demetrios Komnenos Eudaimonoioannes was a Byzantine Greek official in Serres in the 1360s.

He is attested in documents as the kephale (governor) of Serres in 1360, and as holding the post of katholikos krites (senior judge of appeals) in the city in 1365–66. Although the city was part of the Serbian Empire at the time, as a recently conquered former Byzantine land, its administration was carried out in the Byzantine pattern and largely entrusted to local Greeks.

References

Sources
 
 

14th-century Byzantine people
Demetrios
History of Serres
People of the Serbian Empire